Eric Weeger (born 2 February 1997) is a German professional footballer who plays as a defender for SpVgg Ansbach.

Career
Weeger made his professional debut in the 3. Liga for 1860 Munich on 10 November 2018, starting before being substituted off in the 55th minute for Marius Willsch in the 1–1 home draw against Hallescher FC.

Following the expiry of his contract at 1860 Munich, he signed for SpVgg Ansbach in September 2020.

References

External links
 Profile at DFB.de
 

1997 births
Living people
German footballers
People from Ansbach (district)
Sportspeople from Middle Franconia
Footballers from Bavaria
Association football defenders
TSV 1860 Munich II players
TSV 1860 Munich players
SpVgg Ansbach players
3. Liga players
Regionalliga players